In mathematics, the  Beurling–Lax theorem is a theorem due to  and  which characterizes the shift-invariant subspaces of the Hardy space . It states that each such space is of the form

 

for some inner function .

See also
H2

References

 Jonathan R. Partington, Linear Operators and Linear Systems, An Analytical Approach to Control Theory, (2004) London Mathematical Society Student Texts 60, Cambridge University Press.
 Marvin Rosenblum and James Rovnyak, Hardy Classes and Operator Theory, (1985) Oxford University Press.

Hardy spaces
Theorems in analysis
Invariant subspaces